Khusrau Mirza (16 August 1587 – 26 January 1622) was the eldest son of the Mughal Emperor Jahangir and his first wife, Shah Begum.

He was beloved of his grandfather, Mughal Emperor Akbar and his grandmother, Mariam-uz-Zamani. The young prince displayed exceptional skills and wisdom and had the privilege to be groomed by the Mughal Emperor Akbar himself for the throne of the Mughal Empire. He turned out to be the most capable and qualified son of Jahangir but was befallen by an unfortunate destiny. Being Jahangir's eldest son, he was the heir-apparent to his father but Jahangir favoured his son Khurram Mirza for the animosity he held for Khusrau.

The charismatic prince was beloved of the common people widely known for his valour, secularism and battlefield talent, and was free of all vices of the people of his age. It is noted that Akbar use to see himself in Khusrau, as a very brave, capable, talented battlefield commander and charismatic person. Khusrau Mirza had powerful people backing him which included his father-in-law Mirza Aziz Koka, his maternal uncle Raja Man Singh, Queen Mother Mariam-uz-Zamani, Salima Sultan Begum and Jahangir's favourite sister Shakr-un-Nissa Begum, all of them together who tried to secure a pardon for the charming prince and save him from the death penalty.

Birth and Background
Khusrau was born in Lahore on August 16, 1587, as the eldest son and second child of Jahangir. His mother, Man Bai, was the daughter of Raja Bhagwant Das of Amber (Jaipur), head of the Kachhwaha clan of Rajputs and was the chief wife of his father. She was the niece of the mother-in-law, Mariam-uz-Zamani, and thus the maternal cousin of her husband. At the accountant of Khusrau's birth, his father honored his mother with the title of  'Shah Begum' .

His mother was highly devoted to her husband and sided with her husband Prince Salim than her son Khusrau when the latter would overlook his father. She also continuously advised Khusrau to be sincere to his father and committed suicide on May 5, 1605, by consuming opium when the animosity between father and son seemingly wouldn't subside and the chances of their reconciliation became zilch. He was extremely beloved of his grandfather Akbar, whom Khusrau would term Shahi Baba(father), and his father Salim as Shahi Bhai(elder brother).

Education
Khusrau received an extensive and top-tier education which was overseen by Emperor Akbar. Akbar had appointed his most able and talented nobles who happened to be his Navratanas, for the education of the young Prince. He had commenced his linguistic education under the liberal scholar Abu'l-Fazl ibn Mubarak who was the Grand Vizier of Akbar, and by his brother, the learned, Abu'l Khair.

He received military training under the most trusted and highest-ranking noble, Raja Man Singh, who was his maternal uncle. A revered Hindu Brahmin named Shiv Dutt Bhattacharya was appointed Khusrau's teacher who had taught him at length about various Hindu scriptures. Furthermore, Akbar himself would invest time in his military training to teach him various warfare tactics.

Character and Personality
As noted by a European clergyman of the Mughal court, Khusrau is reported to have a pleasing presence and excellent carriage and was exceedingly beloved of the common people, their love and delight. The charismatic Prince was beloved of the common people widely known for his valor, secularism, battlefield talent, and was free of all vices of the people of his age. On 28 March 1594, Akbar made a decision in honor of the young Prince that was unprecedented in the Mughal Court. He granted Khusrau, a high imperial rank of 5000 at the time he was just six years old. Along with the high-ranking mansab, he assigned the financial resources of province Orissa to the young prince. Raja Man Singh, his maternal uncle, who was Akbar's most trusted general and one of his nine gems, was made his guardian. Further, Akbar insisted that the Prince was to remain under his exclusive charge and groomed him personally which was an honor exclusive to this Prince only.

An incident noted by a Christian missionary of his first encounter with Prince Khusrau, records, "On the evening following our arrival, the Emperor(Akbar) called us and showed us pictures of our Savior(Jesus Christ) and the Blessed Virgin(Mother Mary), and held them in his arms with as much as reverence as though it was our priests. When we saw the holy pictures, we knelt down and seeing this the Emperor's 7 years old grandson(Khusrau), the Prince's son, also clasped his hands and bent his knees: wherein the Emperor was delighted and said to the prince(Salim) 'Look at your son(Khusrau).'"

He has high praises reserved for himself in the biography of his grandfather, Akbar. Abul Fazl states him as a young prince with possession of great wisdom. Akbar also proclaimed that he loves his grandchildren (Khusrau and Khurram) more than his children. After the death of Prince Daniyal, favorite son of Akbar, Akbar openly started bestowing imperial favors on Khusrau and his supporters which were prerogative of the apparent successor. Akbar made Khusrau the commander of 10,000 forces, after which his status became equal to that of his father, Salim. His status in subsequent months was raised above his father's, Salim when Akbar assigned him drum and tuman-togh, the symbols of honor that were exclusive to the Emperor himself. In 1605, Khusrau was a young prince of age 17, of eminently handsome countenance, agreeable manners, and irreproachable character.

His father-in-law, foster brother of Emperor Akbar, Mirza Aziz Koka was so much devoted to the cause of Khusrau that he is recorded to have repeatedly declared:

Family
Khusrau's first wife and chief consort was the daughter of extremely powerful Mirza Aziz Koka, known as Khan Azam, son of Jiji Anga, Emperor Akbar's milk mother. When Khusrau's marriage was arranged with her, an order was given that S'aid Khan Abdullah Khan and Mir Sadr Jahan should convey 100,000 rupees as sachaq to the Mirza's house by the way of Sihr Baha. She was his favorite wife, and was the mother of his eldest son, Dawar Bakhsh, and his second son, Prince Buland Akhtar Mirza, born on 11 March 1609, who died in infancy.

Another of Khusrau's wives was the daughter of Jani Beg Tarkhan of Thatta. She was the sister of Mirza Ghazi Beg. The marriage was arranged by Khusrau's grandfather, Emperor Akbar. Another of his wives was the daughter of Muqim, son of Mihtar Fazil Rikabdar (stirrup holder). She was the mother of Prince Gurshasp Mirza, born on 8 April 1616. Khusrau had a daughter, Hoshmand Banu Begum, born in about 1605, and married to Prince Hoshang Mirza, son of Prince Daniyal Mirza.

Jahangir's Reign
Emperor Akbar, who had been deeply disappointed with Khusrau's father, Jahangir, due to his debauchery, negligence of duties, and rebellions against Akbar, favored his grandson, Khusrau for the succession to the Mughal throne over Jahangir. In 1605, after the death of Akbar, Prince Khusrau's position and influence in the court weakened after his father's succession. Jahangir who was extremely angered by his son as he was favored by Akbar for succession to the Mughal throne and had been insincere to him was eventually made to pardon him by the intervention of his mother, step-mother, and sisters. Mariam-uz-Zamani, Khusrau's grandmother became the prime shield of Khusrau during Jahangir's reign and as noted by a Christian missionary present in the Mughal court, she secured a pardon for the prince along with Salima Sultan Begum, Shakr-un-Nissa Begum, and Emperor Jahangir's other sisters upon Jahangir's succession.

Rebellion and aftermath
In 1606, Khusrau rebelled against his father to secure the throne for himself.

Khusrau was allowed to leave Agra on April 6, 1606, with 350 horsemen on the pretext of visiting the tomb of Akbar at nearby Sikandra by the intervention of Salima Sultan Begum. In Mathura, he was joined by Hussain Beg, with about 3000 horsemen. In Panipat, he was joined by Abdur Rahim, the provincial dewan (administrator) of Lahore. When Khusrau reached Taran Taran near Amritsar, he received the blessings of Guru Arjan Dev.

Khusrau laid siege on Lahore, defended by Dilawar Khan. Jahangir soon reached Lahore with a large army and Khusrau was defeated in the battle of Bhairowal. He and his followers tried to flee towards Kabul, but they were captured by Jahangir's army while crossing the Chenab.

Khusrau was first brought to Delhi, where a novel punishment was meted out to him. He was seated in grand style on an elephant and paraded down Chandni Chowk, while on both sides of the narrow street, the noblemen and barons who had supported him were held at knife-point on raised platforms. As the elephant approached each such platform, the luckless supporter was impaled on a stake (through his bowels), while Khusrau was compelled to watch the grisly sight and listen to the screams and pleas of those who had supported him. This was repeated numerous times throughout the entire length of Chandni Chowk.

Khusrau was then partially blinded by his father Jahangir(in 1607) and imprisoned in Agra. He accompanied his father on his trip to Kabul while being in shackles. Jahangir however filled with guilt later asked his health officials to find a remedy for the recovery of his son's eyesight though they remained unsuccessful.

Ellison B. Findly notes a strong-worded letter of Mariam-uz-Zamani to her son, Jahangir, written by her in the year 1616, expressing her concern for the safety of Khusrau Mirza in which she had anticipated that if Khusrau's charge was to be entrusted to Prince Khurram whom she believed was eager to eliminate Khusrau to secure his succession to Mughal throne, she said that he would eventually kill Khusrau and it would be disastrous for the Mughal dynasty as the future male descendants would use it as a specimen to murder their brothers for the possession of the royal throne. Further, Findly adds that this foretelling of her substantiated soon afterward in the Mughal Empire when Shah Jahan's kids, Aurangzeb and Dara Shikoh had a face-off for the royal throne eventually leading to the murder of Prince Dara Shikoh by his brother.

Nur Jahan is reported to have faked tears in front of her mother-in-law, Queen Mother Mariam-uz-Zamani for the possession of the charge of Prince Khusrau who was considered a powerful contender to the throne by the ambitious empress Nur Jahan. It is noted that when Jahangir was drunk and was not in his senses, Nur Jahan Junta would take advantage of this situation and would often ask for the transfer of Prince Khusrau to themselves but their attempts would repeatedly fail. In 1616, he was handed over to Asaf Khan, the brother of Nur Jahan. His grandmother, who was strictly against his transfer, was ensured of the Prince's safety by Jahangir. In 1620, he alongside his cousins, sons of late Prince Daniyal were eventually handed over to his younger brother, Prince Khurram.

In 1620, Nur Jahan in order to secure her power in the Mughal court after the decline of her husband, Jahangir's health, offered the marriage proposal of her daughter to the charismatic Prince Khusrau with the affirmation of bringing him back to power. He was the first choice of Empress Nur Jahan for the marriage of her daughter, Ladli Begum as he was the favorite of common people who desperately wanted to see him on the throne and was highly backed by the revered people of Mughal Court owing to his exceptional capabilities and talent. However, the Prince in an effort to uphold the fidelity to his chief wife refused the marriage proposal though his wife begged him to accept the proposal and subsequently, this proposal was passed onto Prince Khurram upon whose refusal it was finally passed to and accepted by Shahryar Mirza.

Death

In 1622, Khusrau was killed on the orders of Prince Khurram future shah jahan. The reason for issuing this order, reported to Jahangir by Prince Khurram, was the escape attempt made by Prince Khusrau. In order to honor his son, Jahangir had him buried next to the tomb of his mother, Shah Begum and ordered the construction of a mausoleum, which is located in Allahabad(prayagraj)and is called Khusro Bagh in the memory of the Mughal Prince.

Posterity
After the death of Jahangir in 1627, Khusrau's son, Prince Dawar was briefly made ruler of the Mughal Empire by Asaf Khan to secure the Mughal throne for Shah Jahan.

On Jumada-l awwal 2, 1037 AH (December 30, 1627), Shah Jahan was proclaimed as the emperor at Lahore. On Jumada-l awwal 26, 1037 AH (January 23, 1628), Dawar, his brother Garshasp, uncle Shahryar, as well as Tahmuras and Hoshang, sons of the deceased Prince Daniyal, were all put to death by Asaf Khan, who was ordered by Shah Jahan to send them "out of the world", which he faithfully carried out.

Ancestry

References

Bibliography

External links
History of India - Shah Jahan
Jahangir

Mughal princes
People from Lahore
1587 births
1622 deaths
Mughal nobility
Indian nobility
Indian royalty
Mughal royalty
17th-century Indian Muslims
Executed royalty
Executed Indian people
17th-century executions in India
Assassinated Indian people
Heirs apparent who never acceded
People executed by the Mughal Empire
Timurid dynasty